World Series Baseball '98 is a traditional baseball simulation video game by Sega, released in North America and South Korea for the Sega Saturn and Sega Genesis as a sequel to World Series Baseball II.

The game was first released in Japan under the title  which used the Nippon Professional Baseball license.

Gameplay

Development and release

Reception 

The Saturn version received favorable reviews according to the review aggregation website GameRankings. In Japan, Famitsu gave it a score of 27 out of 40.

The series' transition to polygonal graphics was generally approved of, particularly since the game still runs as fast as its predecessors, though multiple reviewers criticized that the bats are grossly out-of-proportion, saying they look like two-by-four lumber planks. Most also commented on the inability to trade players. However, the batting/pitching quadrant system was highly praised. Next Generation, in particular, argued that in conjunction with the deep fielding controls and management strategies, the quadrant system makes World Series Baseball '98 a genre-redefining game comparable to the likes of Doom and NFL GameDay 97. The reviewer stated, "Clearly, this is the new standard for baseball games, and there are no current games that even come close. Saturn may not have much, but it's got baseball." Other critics were more moderate, though still positive. GamePro concluded that the fast, fun nature of the game overrides its issues with graphics and sounds, and compared it favorably to contemporary baseball games on the Saturn such as Grand Slam. Kraig Kujawa and Dean Hager both said that it is inferior to MLB '98, but still very good, and Hager added, "I'll say for sure it's the best baseball game for the Saturn."

The Genesis version was released at the end of the console's lifespan and was largely ignored by the press. A brief review in GamePro criticized that the only improvements over World Series Baseball '96 are updated rosters and interleague play, making it only worth buying for those who do not yet have a baseball game for the Genesis.

The Saturn version was a finalist for the Academy of Interactive Arts & Sciences' 1997 "Sports Game of the Year" award, which went to International Superstar Soccer 64.

Notes

References

External links 
 
 

1997 video games
World Series Baseball video games
Sega video games
Sega Genesis games
Sega Saturn games
Video games developed in the United States
Video games set in 1998